The 1986–87 season was the 90th season of competitive football in Scotland.

In the first full season under the management of player-manager Graeme Souness, Rangers won their first league title since 1978, and also won the League Cup. The title winning side featured two English players enjoying their first season north of the border - defender Terry Butcher and goalkeeper Chris Woods.

Celtic manager David Hay paid the price for a trophyless season and was sacked after four years, paving the way for the return of Billy McNeill, the man he had succeeded in 1983.

Aberdeen manager Alex Ferguson moved south of the border on 6 November to manage Manchester United. He was succeeded at Pittodrie by Ian Porterfield. At the end of the season, Ferguson brought Celtic's top scorer Brian McClair to United, while McClair's strike-partner Mo Johnston moved to France to sign for Nantes.

St Mirren won the Scottish Cup with a 1–0 win over Dundee United in the final. Dundee United also lost to IFK Goteborg of Sweden in the UEFA Cup final.

Scottish Premier Division

Champions: Rangers 
Relegated: Clydebank, Hamilton Academical

Scottish League Division One

Promoted: Morton, Dunfermline Athletic
Relegated: Brechin City, Montrose

Scottish League Division Two

Promoted: Meadowbank Thistle, Raith Rovers

Other honours

Cup honours

Non-league honours

Senior

Individual honours

Scotland national team

Key:
(H) = Home match
(A) = Away match
ECQG7 = European Championship qualifying - Group 7

See also
1986–87 Aberdeen F.C. season
1986–87 Dundee United F.C. season
 Dubai Champions Cup

Notes and references

 
Seasons in Scottish football